Andrew Mackintosh is an actor best known for his role as DS Alistair Greig a character he played for ten years in the long-running ITV drama The Bill.

Amongst his other television credits include appearing in series 2 episode 1 of Goodness Gracious Me the TV series, where he played a character assumed to be D.S. Greig from The Bill (DS Greig), although his name was never mentioned. At the beginning of the sketch, The Bill theme was played and he was playing a CID officer.

In 2017, Mackintosh became the fourth star of The Bill to share his memories of working on the series, as well as his life and career in general, for "The Bill Podcast".

In 2020, Mackintosh was reunited with eight of his Sun Hill co-stars for a three-part Zoom reunion for The Bill Podcast Patreon Channel.

References

External links

The Bill Podcast Interview

British male television actors
Living people
People educated at Waid Academy
1960 births